Boubacar Toure  (born 31 December 1995) is a Senegalese professional basketball player for Tofaş of the Basketbol Süper Ligi (BSL). He played college basketball for the Grand Canyon Antelopes and Eastern Michigan Eagles.

Early life and high school career
Toure was born and grew up in Dakar. The first time he began playing basketball, he decided he wanted to become a professional player. Toure's volleyball coach attempted to get him to give up basketball, but he refused. He attended a prestigious basketball camp in Johannesburg, with NBA coaches in attendance. Toure moved to the United States in 2013 to play basketball. He attended Phase One Academy in Mesa, Arizona, and committed to Grand Canyon University.

College career
Toure was forced to redshirt his first year at Grand Canyon due to not qualifying academically. He averaged 4.4 points and 3.8 rebounds over the course of eight games as a freshman, and posted 14 points against Black Hills State University. Toure missed the remainder of the season with an injury, and was also sidelined during the 2016-17 season after tearing his ACL in practice in the preseason. He transferred to Eastern Michigan. He became the first Eagles player to have back-to-back double-doubles to start his career since 1971. Toure averaged 8.6 points and 7.8 rebounds a game as a junior. He had a season-high 16 rebounds along with 12 points against Northern Illinois on March 2, 2019. As a senior at Eastern Michigan, Toure averaged 10.7 points, 9.3 rebounds, 1.1 steals and 1.4 blocks per game. He was named to the MAC All-Defensive Team as well as Honorable Mention All-MAC. Toure had 13 double-doubles during his senior season, with his last coming in the first round of the MAC Tournament against Kent State with 14 points and 13 rebounds. He finished his career first in Eastern Michigan history with a 65.3 career field-goal percentage, and his 86 blocks rank ninth in program history.

Professional career
On June 17, 2020, Toure signed with Chorale Roanne Basket of the LNB Pro A. He averaged 10 points and 4.5 rebounds, while shooting 70.7% from the field, in his rookie season. In January 2021, Toure punched opponent Miralem Halilović of Metropolitans 92 in a LNB game. Halilović went on to miss the remainder the season due to the punch. On October 13, 2022, a French court sentenced Toure to a suspended 10-month times of prison time and ordered him to pay approximately €40,000 to Halilović.

On July 4, 2022, he has signed with Tofaş of the Turkish BSL.

Personal life
Toure has one brother and four sisters. Toure is an avid soccer fan, with his favorite team being FC Barcelona. He speaks three languages: English, French, and Wolof.

References

External links
Eastern Michigan Eagles bio

 

1995 births
Living people
Basketball players from Dakar
Centers (basketball)
Chorale Roanne Basket players
Eastern Michigan Eagles men's basketball players
Grand Canyon Antelopes men's basketball players
Senegalese expatriate basketball people in France
Senegalese expatriate basketball people in the United States
Senegalese men's basketball players
Tofaş S.K. players